× Trichocidium, abbreviated as Trcdm. in the horticultural trade, is the orchid nothogenus comprising intergeneric hybrids of the two orchid genera Oncidium and Trichocentrum (Onc. x Trctm.).

References

Orchid nothogenera
Oncidiinae